James Whetstone Overstreet (August 28, 1866 – December 4, 1938) was a U.S. Representative from Georgia.

Born on a farm near Sylvania, Georgia, Overstreet attended the rural schools and Sylvania High School.
He was graduated from Mercer University in 1888.
He studied law in Augusta.
He was admitted to the bar in 1892 and commenced practice in Sylvania, Georgia.
He served as member of the State house of representatives in 1898 and 1899.
He served as member of the Democratic executive committee in 1905 and 1906.
He was appointed judge of the city court of Sylvania in December 1902 and served until October 1, 1906, when he resigned.

Overstreet was elected as a Democrat to the Fifty-ninth Congress to fill the vacancy caused by the death of Rufus E. Lester and served from October 3, 1906, to March 4, 1907.
He resumed the practice of law in Sylvania.
He served as delegate to the Democratic National Convention in 1912.

Overstreet was elected to the Sixty-fifth, Sixty-sixth, and Sixty-seventh Congresses (March 4, 1917 – March 3, 1923).
He was an unsuccessful candidate for renomination in 1922.
He resumed the practice of law in Sylvania, Georgia, where he died December 4, 1938.
He was interred in Sylvania Cemetery.

References

External links
 

1866 births
1938 deaths
Democratic Party members of the Georgia House of Representatives
Democratic Party members of the United States House of Representatives from Georgia (U.S. state)
People from Sylvania, Georgia